Tendong–Mulong Highway, Federal Route 208 (formerly Kelantan State Route D112) is a major highway in Kelantan, Malaysia.
 
The kilometre zero of Federal Route 208 starts at Tendong.

At most sections, the Federal Route 208 was built under the JKR R5 road standard, allowing maximum speed limit of up to 90 km/h.

List of junctions and towns

References

Highways in Malaysia
Malaysian Federal Roads